A maze is a type of puzzle that consists of a complex branching passage through which the solver must find a route.

Maze, The Maze or Mazes may also refer to:

Places 
 Maze (HM Prison), a former prison in Northern Ireland
 MacArthur Maze, a freeway interchange in Oakland, California
 Maże, Poland
 Maze, County Down, an electoral ward in Northern Ireland
 Masi, Norway, also known as Máze, a Sami community in Norway
 Maze, Pennsylvania, unincorporated community
 Mazes, a townland in County Antrim, Northern Ireland
 Mazetown, County Antrim, a hamlet in Northern Ireland
 "The Maze" or "Maze District," the westernmost district of Canyonlands National Park
 The Maze, Nottingham

People 
 Michael Maze (born 1981), Danish table tennis player
 Paul Maze (1887–1979), French impressionist painter who influenced Sir Winston Churchill
 Tina Maze (born 1983), Slovenian alpine skier

Fictional characters 
 Mazikeen aka "Maze", a DC comics character
 A character in the video game Fable

Books 
 MAZE: Solve the World's Most Challenging Puzzle, a 1985 book by Christopher Manson
 Maze (novel), a 1993 light novel series by Satoru Akahori
 The Maze (novel), a 2004 novel by the Greek writer Panos Karnezis
 The Maze, a 1998 book by Will Hobbs
 The Maze, a 2004 novel by Monica Hughes

Film, TV and video games 
 Maze (2000 film), a 2000 film starring Rob Morrow
 Maze (2017 film), a 2017 film by Stephen Burke about the escape from Northern Ireland's Maze (HM Prison)
 The Maze (1953 film), a sci-fi horror film released in 3-D
 The Maze (2010 film), a horror film
 The Maze (2018 film)
 William Kurelek's The Maze, a 2011 documentary film
 "The Maze" (Miami Vice), an episode of the television series Miami Vice
 Westworld: The Maze, the first season of the television series, Westworld
 Maze (1973 video game), considered one of the earliest examples of a first-person shooter video game

Music 
 Maze (band), a 1970s-1990s R&B/soul band
 Mazes (band), an English band
 Maze (album), a Japanese-language album by Nothing's Carved in Stone 2015
 The Maze (album), a 1999 album and title song by Vinnie Moore
 Maze, a 1999 album by David Kikoski
 "Maze" (song), a 2002 song by Japanese pop artist Koda Kumi
 "Maze", a song by Juice Wrld from the 2019 album Death Race for Love
 "Maze", a song by Tohoshinki from the 2008 single "Keyword"
 "The Maze", a song by Stars from the 2018 album There Is No Love in Fluorescent Light
 "Maze", a song by Jessica Mauboy from her 2010 album Get 'Em Girls
 "Maze", a song by Phish from the 1993 album Rift
 "Maze", a song from the soundtrack of the anime Noir
 "The Maze", a song by Miles Davis from the 1985 live album Tutu
 "The Maze", a song by Lacuna Coil from the 2009 album Shallow Life
 "Maze Song"

Other 
 The Maze (painting), a 1953 painting by William Kurelek
 Maze (solitaire), a card game
 Maze, a term used in graph theory as it applies to topology
 Haunted attraction (simulated), also known as "haunts" or "mazes"
 Scary Maze Game, a popular flash game designed to frighten the viewer.

See also
 
 
 Maze River (disambiguation)
 Maize (disambiguation)
 Mace (disambiguation)
 Mase (disambiguation)